John Robert Beach (June 10, 1871 – September 11, 1954) was an American farmer and politician.

Beach was born on a farm in Olmsted County, Minnesota. He went to the Olmsted County public schools and to Darlings Business College. Beach lived in Stewartville, Minnesota, with his wife and family and was a farmer. He served in the Minnesota House of Representatives in 1931 and 1932.

References

1871 births
1954 deaths
People from Olmsted County, Minnesota
Farmers from Minnesota
Members of the Minnesota House of Representatives